David Hartford (1873–1932) was an American actor and film director best known for directing the movie Back to God's Country (1919).

Selected filmography
The Dead End (1914)
Tess of the Storm Country (1914)
 The Bride of Hate (1917)
 Blood Will Tell (1917)
Madam Who? (1918)
 The Turn of a Card (1918)
 Inside the Lines (1918)
Rose o' Paradise (1918)
It Happened in Paris (1919, co-directed with Richard Gordon Matzene)
Back to God's Country (1919)
Nomads of the North (1920)
The Golden Snare (1921)
 The Rapids (1922)
Blue Water (1924)
 Then Came the Woman (1926)
 The Man in the Shadow (1926)
 God's Great Wilderness (1927)
Rose of the Bowery (1927)
Rough Romance (1930)
Over the Hill (1931)

References

External links

 

1873 births
1932 deaths
American film directors